Bahaa El-Dine Rafic Al-Hariri (born 26 April 1966) is a Lebanese-Saudi billionaire business man. He is the eldest son of assassinated former Lebanese Prime Minister Rafic Hariri from his father's first marriage with Nida Bustani, an Iraqi. He is the brother of former Lebanese Prime Minister Saad Hariri.

Since the start of the uprising in Lebanon in October 2019, Hariri has been vocal in his support for the protestors, speaking out about corruption in the political system and the failure of the state to support the people.

Early years
Bahaa Hariri was born in Saudi-Arabia on 26 April 1966. He holds a master's degree in business administration from Boston University. After completing his studies, he moved to work for his family Construction and Development company Saudi Oger Ltd.

Business activities 
In 2002, Hariri founded Horizon Group, a real estate holding company with investments in Lebanon, Jordan and Saudi Arabia. He is the majority owner of Globe Express Services, a logistics company with a presence in more than 100 countries.

He has invested in New Abdali, a planned commercial district of Amman, Jordan. The project in partnership with the Jordanian government focuses on the development of the old downtown district of Al-Abdali, including luxury shopping, residences and offices.

In 2008, he sold his stake in Saudi Oger, the family construction business, to his brother Saad Hariri, the former prime minister of Lebanon.

In 2010, Bahaa made a pledge to create the Rafik B. Hariri Institute for Computing and Computational Science & Engineering in Boston University, where Hariri is currently a member of the board of trustees.

In May 2011, he inaugurated the Rafik Hariri Center for the Middle East at the Atlantic Council, a think-tank based in Washington DC. He sits on the Atlantic Council's international advisory board.

In June 2017, "ABC Verdun", a shopping mall in Beirut, was launched as a joint development between Hariri's real estate company Verdun 1544 and ABC.

Community support 
In February 2021, Hariri made a significant donation to the Lebanese American University Medical Center (LAUMC) to help carry out its vaccination campaign to fight the COVID -19 virus. He also donated oxygen concentrators to the Lebanese Red Cross to alleviate the suffering of Lebanese citizens in the time of the pandemic.

Personal life 
Hariri is married to Hassnah Abousabah Hariri (#3) and is the father of 5 children.

See Also 

 List of political families in Lebanon
 Rafic Hariri

References

1966 births
Living people
Children of national leaders
Bahaa
Lebanese billionaires
Lebanese businesspeople
Lebanese expatriates in Switzerland
Lebanese people of Iraqi descent
Lebanese Sunni Muslims
20th-century Saudi Arabian businesspeople
21st-century Saudi Arabian businesspeople
Saudi Arabian billionaires
Saudi Arabian people of Iraqi descent
Saudi Arabian people of Lebanese descent
Boston University alumni